Imithente (named after a kind of grass that grows in rural KwaZulu Natal) is a Maskandi group from Johannesburg, South Africa. 

The band was formed in 1993 by late guitarist, Simosakhe Mthalane, and three female singers: Buselaphi Gxowa, Dumisile Manana and Nokwazi Ntuli, all from KwaZulu-Natal. They have produced several albums attaining gold sales in their home country and won SAMA and SATMA awards.

The group performs as a 10-piece band with 6 singer/dancers and 4 musicians.

Discography

studio albums
 Isidikiselo  (2001)
 Awusay' Ebhodweni (2002)
 Ngiyakushiya Mawulele (2003)
 Umnyango Ongenasikhiye (2004)
 Igaz' Elibabayo (2005)
 Ake Niyek' Ukukhuluma (2006)
 Bamb' Ezakho (2007)
 Simqonda Ngqo (2008)
 Vimb' Ezansi (2010)
 Mbibi (2011)
 Vuka Mathambo (2012)
 Ichakijani (2014)
 Mhlobo Wami (2014)
 Washonaphi (2015)
 S'yawuvala Umlomo (2016)
 Asekhon' Amalahle ? (2018)
 Uzoyikhona Kanjani (2018)

International performances
 2002 La Rochelle, France and India
 2008 Vienna
 2009 Algiers for the Pan African Cultural Festival.

External links
 http://www.womex.com/virtual/lee_thorp/imithente

Maskanda musicians